According to Article 20 of the Constitution, the crown of Morocco passes according to agnatic primogeniture among the descendants of King Mohammed VI – unless the reigning monarch designates a younger son as heir apparent – failing which it devolves to "the closest male in the collateral consanguinity".

Current line of succession

 King Mohammed V (1909–1961)
 King Hassan II (1929–1999)
 King Mohammed VI (born 1963) 
(1) Crown Prince Moulay Hassan (born 2003)
(2) Prince Moulay Rachid (born 1970)
(3) Prince Moulay Ahmed (born 2016)
(4) Prince Moulay Abdeslam (born 2022)
Prince Moulay Abdallah (1935–1983)
(5) Prince Moulay Hicham (born 1964)
(6) Prince Moulay Ismail (born 1981)
(7) Sharif Moulay Abdallah (born 2010)
Prince Moulay Idriss (1908–1962)
''Prince Moulay Ali (1924–1988)
(8) Sharif Moulay Abdallah (born 1965)
(9) Sharif Moulay Youssef (born 1969)

See also
 List of rulers of Morocco
 History of Morocco
 Order of succession

Morocco
Morocco politics-related lists
Moroccan monarchy
Line of succession